The Larkin Sentral (Jawi: لرکين سينترل) (formerly Larkin Bus and Taxi Terminal) is a bus terminal located in Johor Bahru, Johor, Malaysia. It has direct bus services to and from many cities and towns in Peninsular Malaysia, Singapore and Hat Yai in Thailand. This T-shaped terminal has three levels and about 50 bus bays.

Cross Border Bus Service to Singapore

To Queen Street Bus Terminal
 SBS Transit Bus Service 170 (Red Plate)
 Causeway Link Bus Service CW2
 Singapore Johore Express (SJE)

To Kranji MRT station 
 Causeway Link Bus Service CW1

To Jurong East Bus Interchange 
 Causeway Link Bus Service CW3 via Second Link

Basic Bus Service

SBS Transit 
 Service 170 (Red Plate) (To Queen Street Bus Terminal, Singapore)

Since on 1 November 2014

Closures of Kotaraya II Terminal
For SBS Transit Bus Service 160, 170x (Blue Plate), and SMRT Bus Service 950 will loop at JB Sentral (Bus Stop 47701) along Jalan Tun Abdul Razak to head back to Singapore. This is due to the permanent closure of the Kotaraya II Terminal.

Since on 1 March 2015

Amended to JB Sentral Bus Terminal
 For SBS Transit Bus Service is 160,170x (Blue Plate),and SMRT Bus Service 950 has Amended to call at JB Sentral Bus Terminal and also Skip along the Bus Stop at Jalan Tun Abdul Razak.
The Location of JB Sentral Bus Terminal is at Jalan Jim Quee.

3 March 2015
Larkin Sentral received RM 10 million to upgrade their facilities which will be completed on 2016.

See also
 Transport in Malaysia

References

External links

 Timetable of intercity buses at Larkin Bus Terminal
 Timetable and fares of intercity buses at Larkin Bus Terminal

1995 establishments in Malaysia
Buildings and structures in Johor Bahru
Bus stations in Malaysia
Transport in Johor Bahru